Eric W. Benken (born August 20, 1951) is a retired airman of the United States Air Force who served as the 12th Chief Master Sergeant of the Air Force from 1996 to 1999. He was the last Vietnam War veteran to hold the position.

Military career
Benken was born in Cincinnati, Ohio, and entered the United States Air Force in March 1970. His background was in information management. He served in operational, maintenance and support units at every level of command from squadron through Major Command. Benken served in Taiwan, Korea, and South Vietnam, and in a joint service (NATO) assignment at Supreme Headquarters Allied Powers Europe (SHAPE). He served as Senior Enlisted Advisor to the Commanders of 12th Air Force and United States Air Forces in Europe (USAFE). During his tenure as USAFE Senior Enlisted Advisor and Chief Master Sergeant of the Air Force, the Air Force was involved in operations Northern Watch-Southern Watch (Iraq), Provide Promise (Bosnia), Provide Comfort (Iraq), Deliberate Force (Bosnia), Joint Endeavor in Bosnia and Herzegovina, Desert Fox (Iraq) and Allied Force (Kosovo).  

Benken served as the Chief Master Sergeant of the Air Force from November 1996 to July 1999. In this role Benken was the senior enlisted advisor to General Ron Fogleman and General Michael E. Ryan, the respective [[Chief of Staff of the United States Air Force|during his tenure. He also served Secretaries of the Air Force, Sheila Widnall and F. Whitten Peters. Benken's many initiatives included the development of the Command Chief Master Sergeant title (previously Senior Enlisted Advisor) and creation of a distinctive insignia; the implementation of Warrior Week at Basic Military Training; the successful fight against congressional efforts to interfere with gender integrated training at Basic Military Training; fighting for repeal of the 1986 40 percent retirement and creation of the NCO Professional Development Seminar. The Air Force Core Values of Integrity, Service Before Self and Excellence in All You Do were released in January 1997 in "The Little Blue Book." The development of the new Air Force Symbol began in 1998 to enhance recruiting and retention.

Education

Assignments
March 1970 – April 1970, basic trainee, Basic Military Training, Lackland Air Force Base, Texas
May 1970 – December 1970, administrative specialist, 2578th Supply Squadron, Ellington Air Force Base, Texas
January 1971 – March 1972, administrative specialist, maintenance training section and maintenance quality control, 374th Tactical Airlift Wing, Ching Chuan Kang Air Base, Taiwan. Also deployed to Detachment 1, 834th Air Division, Tan Son Nhut Air Base, South Vietnam
April 1972 – September 1978, chief clerk, 67th Reconnaissance Technical Squadron and noncommissioned officer in charge, Director of Operations Administration, 67th Tactical Reconnaissance Wing, Bergstrom Air Force Base, Texas
October 1978 – October 1979, executive noncommissioned officer to the commander, 314th Air Division, Osan Air Base, South Korea
November 1979 – August 1983, NCOIC, Deputy Commander for Resources Administration and NCOIC, 12th Air Force Command Section, Bergstrom Air Force Base, Texas
September 1983 – December 1988, Chief, Administration Communications Division and NCOIC, Deputy Chief of Staff for Aircrew Training Devices Administration, United States Air Force Tactical Air Warfare Center, Eglin Air Force Base, Florida
January 1989 – July 1993, Superintendent, Manpower and Document Control Division, Office of the U. S. National Military Representative, and administrative officer, Assistant Chief of Staff Operations and Logistics Division, Supreme Headquarters Allied Powers Europe, Mons, Belgium
August 1993 – September 1994, Senior Enlisted Adviser to the Commander, 12th Air Force, Davis–Monthan Air Force Base, Arizona
October 1994 – October 1996, Senior Enlisted Adviser to the Commander, United States Air Forces in Europe, Ramstein Air Base, Germany
November 1996 – July 1999, Chief Master Sergeant of the Air Force, The Pentagon, Washington, D.C.

Awards and decorations

References

Living people
Community College of the Air Force alumni
Chief Master Sergeants of the United States Air Force
Recipients of the Air Force Distinguished Service Medal
Recipients of the Legion of Merit
United States Air Force personnel of the Vietnam War
1951 births